Douglas Stewart Allder (born 30 December 1951 in Hammersmith, London) is an English former professional footballer who made over 200 appearances in the Football League for Millwall as a left winger. He was capped by England at youth level and is a member of the Millwall Hall of Fame.

Playing career

Millwall 
Allder began his career with Second Division club Millwall and signed apprentice terms in April 1968 for £4 a week. He signed a professional contract in October 1969, worth £20 a week. He made his debut and broke into the team during the 1969–70 season, making 24 appearances. A dispute with Benny Fenton in 1971 saw Allder play on a week-to-week contract and he nearly moved to play under Gordon Jago at divisional rivals Queens Park Rangers. The move was cancelled after Jago replaced Fenton as Millwall manager, which meant Allder remained at The Den. The Lions occasionally challenged for promotion to First Division, but relegation to Third Division at the end of the 1974–75 season saw Allder depart the club. In his six years with Millwall he made 227 appearances and scored 12 goals. Allder is a member of the Millwall Hall of Fame.

Orient 
In July 1975, Allder moved to Second Division club Orient in exchange for Terry Brisley and Barrie Fairbrother. He left Orient at the end of the 1976–77 season, after making 41 league appearances without scoring. Looking back in 2002, Allder said "I knew straight away it was a bad move. I wasn't happy there".

Free agent 
Allder had a one-month trial with Fourth Division club Torquay United in August 1977 and made one appearance as a substitute for Lindsay Parsons in a League Cup tie away at Cardiff City. In September 1977, he had a month-long trial with Watford and made a single appearance away at Rochdale, in which he was substituted at half-time. Watford went on to win the 1977–78 Fourth Division title and Allder received a winners' medal from chairman Elton John after the final game of the season against Brentford.

Brentford 
In October 1977, Allder joined Fourth Division club Brentford on trial. He quickly became the regular left winger in the team and signed a contract. The Bees were promoted to the Third Division at the end of the season, after securing a fourth-place finish. Allder had an infamous brawl with Sheffield United's Mick Speight during a match at Griffin Park in November 1979, which resulted in the fight spilling over into the Sheffield United dugout and both players being sent off. Allder was released at the end of the 1979–80 season and made 95 appearances and scored three goals during his time at Griffin Park.

Non-League football 
Allder joined Isthmian League club Tooting & Mitcham in 1980. He moved to Staines Town in March 1981, before moving to Walton & Hersham.

Coaching career 
In 1992, Allder was working in the Millwall Centre of Excellence.

Personal life 
As of 2002, Allder was working at Heathrow Airport.

Career statistics

Honours 
Watford
Football League Fourth Division: 1977–78
Brentford
 Football League Fourth Division fourth-place promotion: 1977–78

Individual

Millwall Hall of Fame

References

1951 births
Living people
Footballers from Hammersmith
English footballers
Walton & Hersham F.C. players
Millwall F.C. players
Leyton Orient F.C. players
Torquay United F.C. players
Watford F.C. players
Brentford F.C. players
Staines Town F.C. players
English Football League players
Tooting & Mitcham United F.C. players
Millwall F.C. non-playing staff
England youth international footballers
Isthmian League players
Association football wingers